Richland Township is a civil township of Ogemaw County in the U.S. state of Michigan. The population was 914 at the 2010 census.

Communities

Geography

Demographics
As of the census of 2000, there were 956 people, 379 households, and 280 families residing in the township. There were 614 housing units at an average density of 17.6 per square mile (6.8/km). The racial makeup of the township was 98.43% White, 0.52% Native American, and 1.05% from two or more races. Hispanic or Latino of any race were 2.93% of the population.

There were 379 households, out of which 25.6% had children under the age of 18 living with them, 59.4% were married couples living together, 10.0% had a female householder with no husband present, and 25.9% were non-families. 23.0% of all households were made up of individuals, and 13.7% had someone living alone who was 65 years of age or older.  The average household size was 2.52 and the average family size was 2.93.

In the township the population was spread out, with 25.0% under the age of 18, 6.2% from 18 to 24, 20.9% from 25 to 44, 28.1% from 45 to 64, and 19.8% who were 65 years of age or older.  The median age was 43 years. For every 100 females, there were 96.3 males.  For every 100 females age 18 and over, there were 93.8 males.

The median income for a household in the township was $29,000, and the median income for a family was $33,162. Males had a median income of $29,000 versus $20,750 for females. The per capita income for the township was $13,294.  About 12.7% of families and 17.4% of the population were below the poverty line, including 25.2% of those under age 18 and 15.6% of those age 65 or over.

References

Townships in Ogemaw County, Michigan
Townships in Michigan
Populated places established in 1879
1879 establishments in Michigan